A drug law may refer to:

 the prohibition of drugs
 drug policies other than the prohibition of drugs
 the regulation of therapeutic goods

See also